The 1999–2000 EHF Women's Champions League was the seventh edition of the modern era of the premier competition for European national champions women's handball clubs, running from 1 October 1999 to 27 May 2000. Hypo Niederösterreich defeated Macedonia's Gjorce Petrov in the final to win its eighth title, with Budućnost Podgorica (which defeated defending champion Dunaferr NK in the quarter-finals) and Dynamo Volgograd also reaching the semifinals.

Qualifying round

Group stage

Group A

Group B

Group C

Group D

Quarter-finals

Semifinals

Final

References

Women's EHF Champions League
Ehf Women's Champions League, 1998-99
Ehf Women's Champions League, 1998-99
EHF
EHF